Ragin may refer to:
 Charles C. Ragin, American sociologist and Professor of Sociology and Political Science at the University of Arizona
 Derek Lee Ragin (born 1958), American countertenor
 Hugh Ragin, American jazz trumpeter
 Wah Wah Watson (Melvin M. Ragin, born c. 1951), American guitarist